Taraba State University also known as TSU is located in Jalingo, Taraba State Nigeria.  The university was established by the Taraba State Government in 2008, to widen access to university education for Taraba State indigenes and promote economic growth and development in the state particularly and the country at large.

Academic and administrative structure of the university 
The academic structure of the university consists of faculty-organized research units and relevant teaching and research support units. The department is the basic unit of academic organization aimed at enhancing interaction between related disciplines in the university.  Though each unit of academic discipline is an organizational entity, they all have common teaching and research interests through the spirit of cooperative and interdisciplinary research and the development of group effort.

The administrative set up of a school is centered on the Dean's Office, while the departments concentrate essentially on academic matters and pursuits.  The overall affairs of the university are guided by the council in policy and financial matters, while the senate determines all academic matters.

The vice-chancellor is the chief executive of the university and supervises the academic and administrative operations of the university under the directive and /or advice of relevant committees. Such committees include the council and its committees, the senate and its committees, council/senate joint committees, faculty boards, administrative committees and other statutory committees.

Convocation

In 2018 precisely, Taraba State University had conducted her 1st convocation ceremony which consisted of the 1st, 2nd, 3rd, 4th and 5th sets of graduates in this arena of this academia totaling 5900 students. Out of the these students, 29 graduated with First Class Honors, 1006 Second Class Upper Division, 2083 Second Class Lower, 1850 with Third Class while 32 graduated with passes.

As of 2022, Taraba State University had conducted its 6th, 7th, 8th and 9th combined convocation ceremony where graduates sets of Taraba State University totaling 8,585 out of which 49 graduated with 1st Class Honors, 2,416 with Second Class Honors (Upper Division), 3,983 Second Class Honors (Lower Division), 790 Third Class (Honors) and 20 Pass Degrees. Taraba State University have graduated 106 Postgraduate Diplomas, 311 Master's Degrees and one PhD. The one PhD is awarded to Hanawa Herbert Rufus who has now made history as the first PhD. graduate of Taraba State University.

The occasion also encompassed the conferment of Honorary Doctorate Degrees to four dignitaries who have shown themselves as role models in all ramifications and impacted people.  They include His Excellency, Senator Doctor Ifeanyi Okowa, The Executive Governor, Delta State, Hon. Justice Mahmud Mohammed, Former Chief Justice of Nigeria, Alh. Najeem Usman Yasin (Deputy President NLC, Global Vice President ITF and former President NURTW) and Major General Paul Tarfa (rtd) (Executive Chairman, North East Development Commission).

VICE CHANCELLORS 
The 1st Vice Chancellor of the University from the inception was Dr. Ahmed Usman Jalingo who served from 2008-2010. He died in March 2011. Following that, Prof. Michael Noku served as Acting Vice Chancellor until in January 2012, when the second vice chancellor, Prof. Mohammed Sani Yahaya took over the office until again when Dr. Catherine Musa Ashashim took over as Acting Vice Chancellor in October, 2016 to 28th February, 2017. On 1st March 2017, Prof. Vincent Ado Tenebe joined the list as the 3rd vice chancellor of the university. However, on 1st March 2022, Prof. Sunday Paul Bako became the Vice Chancellor, and he is the current Vice Chancellor of the prestigious university.

Faculty of Education 

 Science Education.
 Arts and Social Sciences Education.
 Educational Foundations.

Faculty of Agriculture 

 Agronomy.
 Animal Science.
 Agricultural Economics & Extension.

Faculty of Social and Management Science 
This is the list of Courses offered in TASU Faculty of Social and Management Science.

 Political Science and International Relations.
 Geography.
 Sociology.
 Mass Communication.
 Economics.
 Business Administration.
 Accountancy.
 Public Administration.
 Islamic studies

Faculty of Science 
 Biological Sciences.
 Chemistry.
 Physics.
 Mathematics and Statistics.
 Computer Science.

Faculty of Arts 
 Language and Linguistics.
 Religious  Studies.
 History and Archeology.

Faculty of Engineering 
 Agricultural and Bio-Resources Engineering.
 Civil Engineering.
 Electrical and Electronic Engineering.
 Mechanical Engineering.

References

External links

https://www.northnods.com/tsu-convocation/

Universities and colleges in Nigeria
Educational institutions established in 2008
2008 establishments in Nigeria
Taraba State